Dénes Pócsik (9 March 1940 in Kunágota – 20 November 2004 in Eger) was a Hungarian water polo player who competed in the 1964 Summer Olympics, in the 1968 Summer Olympics, and in the 1972 Summer Olympics.

See also
 Hungary men's Olympic water polo team records and statistics
 List of Olympic champions in men's water polo
 List of Olympic medalists in water polo (men)

References

External links
 

1940 births
2004 deaths
Hungarian male water polo players
Olympic water polo players of Hungary
Water polo players at the 1964 Summer Olympics
Water polo players at the 1968 Summer Olympics
Water polo players at the 1972 Summer Olympics
Olympic gold medalists for Hungary
Olympic silver medalists for Hungary
Olympic bronze medalists for Hungary
Olympic medalists in water polo
Medalists at the 1972 Summer Olympics
Medalists at the 1968 Summer Olympics
Medalists at the 1964 Summer Olympics
Sportspeople from Békés County